In mathematics, if  is a group and  is a linear representation of it on the vector space , then the dual representation  is defined over the dual vector space  as follows:

The dual representation is also known as the contragredient representation.

 =  for all .

The motivation for this definition is that Lie algebra representation associated to the dual of a Lie group representation is computed by the above formula. But the definition of the dual of a Lie algebra representation makes sense even if it does not come from a Lie group representation.

In both cases, the dual representation is a representation in the usual sense.

Properties

Irreducibility and second dual
If a (finite-dimensional) representation is irreducible, then the dual representation is also irreducible—but not necessarily isomorphic to the original representation. On the other hand, the dual of the dual of any representation is isomorphic to the original representation.

Unitary representations
Consider a unitary representation  of a group , and let us work in an orthonormal basis. Thus,  maps  into the group of unitary matrices. Then the abstract transpose in the definition of the dual representation may be identified with the ordinary matrix transpose. Since the adjoint of a matrix is the complex conjugate of the transpose, the transpose is the conjugate of the adjoint.

The SU(2) and SU(3) cases
In the representation theory of SU(2), the dual of each irreducible representation does turn out to be isomorphic to the representation. But for the representations of SU(3), the dual of the irreducible representation with label  is the irreducible representation with label . In particular, the standard three-dimensional representation of SU(3) (with highest weight ) is not isomorphic to its dual. In the theory of quarks in the physics literature, the standard representation and its dual are called "" and "."

General semisimple Lie algebras
More generally, in the representation theory of semisimple Lie algebras (or the closely related representation theory of compact Lie groups), the weights of the dual representation are the negatives of the weights of the original representation. (See the figure.) Now, for a given Lie algebra, if it should happen that operator  is an element of the Weyl group, then the weights of every representation are automatically invariant under the map . For such Lie algebras, every irreducible representation will be isomorphic to its dual. Lie algebras with this property include the odd orthogonal Lie algebras  (type ) and the symplectic Lie algebras  (type ). 

If, for a given Lie algebra,  is not in the Weyl group, then the dual of an irreducible representation will generically not be isomorphic to the original representation. To understand how this works, we note that there is always a unique Weyl group element  mapping the negative of the fundamental Weyl chamber to the fundamental Weyl chamber. Then if we have an irreducible representation with highest weight , the lowest weight of the dual representation will be . It then follows that the highest weight of the dual representation will be . Since we are assuming  is not in the Weyl group,  cannot be , which means that the map  is not the identity. The adjoint representation, for example, is always isomorphic to its dual.

Then the map  is the reflection about the line through . The self-dual representations are then the ones that lie along the line through . These are the representations with labels of the form , which are the representations whose weight diagrams are regular hexagons.

Motivation
,
where the superscript  is matrix transpose. Consistency requires

With the definition given,

For the Lie algebra representation one chooses consistency with a possible group representation. Generally, if  is a representation of a Lie group, then  given by

is a representation of its Lie algebra.

Example
Consider the group  of complex numbers of absolute value 1. The irreducible representations are all one dimensional, as a consequence of Schur's lemma. The irreducible representations are parameterized by integers  and given explicitly as

Generalization

A general ring module does not admit a dual representation. Modules of Hopf algebras do, however.

See also
 Complex conjugate representation
Tensor product of representations
 Kirillov Character Formula

References
 .

Representation theory of groups